Emil John Mihalik (February 7, 1920 – January 27, 1984) was the first Eparch of the Byzantine Catholic Eparchy of Parma, Ohio. His appointment occurred simultaneously with the erection of the see. At that time, his jurisdiction encompassed central and western Ohio, Arizona, California, Colorado, Indiana, Michigan, Illinois, Wisconsin, Minnesota, Missouri, Iowa, Kansas, Montana, Nevada, New Mexico, Nebraska, North Dakota, South Dakota, Oregon, Utah, Washington, Wyoming, Alaska and Hawaii.

Early life
Emil John Mihalik was born in Pittsburgh, Pennsylvania. He attended high school in Brentwood, Pennsylvania, and received his undergraduate degree from St. Procopius College.

Pastoral appointments
As many Eastern Catholic seminarians of his time, Mihalik attended a Roman Rite seminary, but was  ordained to the Byzantine Catholic priesthood on September 21, 1945, at St. Mary's Church in Trenton, New Jersey, by Bishop Basil Takach.

He was pastor at St. Thomas Church in Rahway, New Jersey, from February 1, 1961, until June 12, 1969, and the Eparchy of Passaic's chancellor.

Eparch of Parma
On February 21, 1969, Pope Paul VI created the Eparchy of Parma. Archbishop Luigi Raimondi, the Apostolic Delegate to the United States, announced its creation and Father Mihalik's appointment effective March 22, 1969.

Mihalik was consecrated as the eparch on June 12, 1969, with Archbishop Stephen Kocisko as his principal consecrator. His principal co-consecrators were Bishops Michael Dudick and Michael Rusnak.

On September 6, 1970, during the 36th annual pilgrimage that drew approximately 45,000 people to Mount Saint Macrina, Mihalik, Kocisko, and Dudick blessed a cornerstone for a 50-bed nursing home.

In May 1977, Bishop Alden Bell of the Diocese of Sacramento gave $20,000, which had been a World War II relief fund for Slovaks, to Mihalik. The eparch said the money would be used to build a church in Sacramento. At the time, all the western US states including Alaska and Hawaii were part of the eparchy.

Final years
Mihalik died in Cleveland, Ohio, on January 27, 1984, shortly before his 64th birthday, leaving the See sede vacante. He died of lung cancer. His vicar general, Monsignor Andrew Vaida, was named as diocesan administrator.

Legacy
During his priesthood, Mihalik is credited with the establishment of 18 parishes and ordaining 23 priests.

Notes

External links
 Emil Mihalik biodata at Catholic Hierarchy website
 
 The Carpathian Connection: Byzantine bishops

1920 births
1984 deaths
Ruthenian Catholic bishops
Benedictine University alumni
American Eastern Catholic bishops
Religious leaders from Pittsburgh
People from Parma, Ohio
20th-century American clergy
Deaths from lung cancer
Deaths from cancer in Ohio